Madness is the fourth studio album by guitarist Tony MacAlpine, released in 1993 through Shrapnel Records.

Track listing

Personnel
Tony MacAlpine – guitar, keyboard, producer
Gina Demos – guitar (track 4)
Glen Sobel – drums, producer
Larry Dennison – bass, producer
Branford Marsalis – saxophone
Matt Finders – trombone
Lee Thornburg – trumpet
Brian Levi – engineer, mixing, producer
Colin Mitchell – engineering assistant
Bernie Grundman – mastering

References

External links
Tony MacAlpine "Madness" at Guitar Nine

Tony MacAlpine albums
1993 albums
Shrapnel Records albums